Patricia Carmel Stewart Kennedy  (17 March 191610 December 2012) was an Australian actress with a long career in theatre, radio, film and television. According to one writer she was "sometimes called the first lady of Melbourne radio and theatre."

Early life
Kennedy was born in Queenscliff, Victoria on St Patrick's Day, 1916. (Many sources give her year of birth as 1917.)  She was raised, and remained, a practising Catholic.

She trained as a school teacher before winning the Colac Amateur Festival around 1938, which sparked a passion for acting. She started her stage career in 1943.

In 1972–1973 she worked as a consultant to the Australia Council for the Arts.

Honours
Kennedy was appointed an Officer of the Order of the British Empire (OBE) in the 1982 New Year Honours, for service to the performing arts.

Personal life
She remained single, very private and very independent.  Even in her 80s, although she owned a house in Melbourne, she preferred to live alone in a hut without electricity, on the edge of a state forest near Bega in southern New South Wales.  This was 5–6 hours drive by road from Melbourne, where she would travel for theatre commitments.  In the 1990s, she was involved in founding the Four Winds Festival in Bermagui.

Kennedy died on 10 December 2012, aged 96.  A private funeral was held on 19 December.

Theatre
Patricia Kennedy was noted for her range – from high drama to comedy. She was mainly based in Melbourne, and had a strong association with the Melbourne Theatre Company (MTC), but she also performed in England with the Bristol Old Vic Company's 1969–1970 season.

She appeared in plays such as Jay Presson Allen's adaptation of Muriel Spark's The Prime of Miss Jean Brodie (1968), Ibsen's Ghosts (1969: Mrs Alving), Shakespeare's All's Well That Ends Well, The Man Who Shot the Albatross (1972), and Some of My Best Friends are Women (1976).

Her portrayal of Mary in the South Australian Theatre Company's Melbourne production of Eugene O'Neill's Long Day's Journey into Night was described as "the best female performance on the Melbourne stage in 1973", and that production is considered one of the landmark productions in Australian theatre, largely due to Patricia Kennedy's involvement.

Plays written for her included the single-hander The Rain by Daniel Keene.

She appeared alongside Zoe Caldwell in the MTC's production of Euripides' Medea, the first production at the Arts Centre Melbourne's Playhouse Theatre in 1984.

In 1991–92, Kennedy appeared in a one-woman stage adaptation of Elizabeth Jolley's novel The Newspaper of Claremont Street staged by the Playbox Theatre Company at a number of venues in Victoria.

She was still active with the MTC well into her 80s.

Radio
In 1946, Kennedy shared the title role in Crawford Productions' radio drama The Melba Story with singer Glenda Raymond (later to become Hector Crawford's wife),

She played Miss Crump on the long-running ABC radio program The Village Glee Club (1942–71).

She also appeared in episodes of the Caltex Theatre.

Selected credits

Film and television
Patricia Kennedy's film roles included:
 The Getting of Wisdom, 1977, as Miss Chapman
 My Brilliant Career, 1979, as Aunt Gussie
Emmett Stone (1985)
 Departure, 1986, as Sylvia Swift
 Country Life (an adaptation of Chekhov's Uncle Vanya), 1994, as Maud Dickens
 Road to Nhill, 1997, as Jean.

Her television appearances included The Flying Doctors, A Country Practice, G.P., Five Mile Creek, Return to Eden, Holiday Island, The Sullivans and Prisoner.

References

1916 births
2012 deaths
Australian film actresses
Australian Officers of the Order of the British Empire
Australian radio actresses
Australian stage actresses
Australian television actresses